Skybridge may refer to:
 Skyway or skybridge, a type of pedestrian bridge
 Jet bridge or skybridge, a retractable connecting bridge between an airport and an aircraft
 SkyBridge (people mover), a people mover in Rome
 Skybridge (TransLink), a bridge in Metro Vancouver, Canada
 Skybridge, Chicago, a building in Chicago, United States
 SkyBridge Capital, an American investment firm
 Davenport Skybridge, a bridge in Iowa, United States
 Gatlinburg Skybridge, a bridge in Tennessee, United States
 Langkawi Sky Bridge, a bridge in Malaysia

See also 
 Airbridge (disambiguation)
 Skye Bridge, a bridge in Scotland
 Skywalk (disambiguation)
 Skyway (disambiguation)